Indosphenia is a genus of bivalves belonging to the family Myidae. This genus is mainly distributed in the fragmented brackish water habitats of India including Chilka Lake and Cochin (kochi) backwaters.

Species:

Indosphenia abbreviata 
Indosphenia cochinensis 
Indosphenia kayalum 
Indosphenia sowerbyi

References

Myidae
Bivalve genera